Route 11 Bypass or Highway 11 Bypass may refer to:
 US 11 Bypass
 North Carolina Highway 11 Bypass

See also
List of highways numbered 11
List of highways numbered 11 Business
List of highways numbered 11A
List of highways numbered 11B
List of highways numbered 11C